Rusty Black is an American politician. He is a Republican representing the 12th district in the Missouri Senate. He previously represented the 7th district in the Missouri House of Representatives from 2017 to 2023, elected in 2016, 2018, and 2020.

Personal life 

Black was born in Saint Joseph, Missouri and graduated from high school in King City, Missouri. He holds a Bachelor of Science and a Master of Science, both in Agriculture Education, from the University of Missouri, and worked as an agriculture educator for 32 years before retiring in 2016. He and his wife live in Chillicothe, Missouri and have four children.

Political career 

In 2016, Black ran for election to the District 7 seat in the Missouri House of Representatives, which was open due to the former representative, Mike Lair, reaching the term limit. Black defeated John Myers in the Republican primary with 86.42% of the vote, and was unopposed in the general election. In 2018, he defeated Democrat Dennis VanDyke with 79.6% of the vote, and ran unopposed in 2020. He won the Republican Primary in August 2022 for Senate district 12, defeating two opponents, and then won the general election by a landslide.

Electoral  History

State Representative

State Senate

References 

Living people
Republican Party members of the Missouri House of Representatives
University of Missouri alumni
Year of birth missing (living people)
21st-century American politicians